The University of Colorado Denver Business School is a college located in Denver, Colorado, which offers undergraduate and graduate business degrees. The Business School is accredited by the Association to Advance Collegiate Schools of Business (AACSB).
As of fall 2022, there were 1,932 undergraduate students and  1,719 students enrolled in the Graduate programs. The school has over 27,000 alumni. CU Denver Business School offers the 2nd best public business school program in Colorado. It is the 9th largest AACSB-accredited business school in the United States to offer a full-time specialized master's degree program.[2] 

In 2012, The Business School moved to its current location in downtown Denver at 1475 Lawrence Street. The 120,000-square-foot building contains both the Business School offices and classrooms.[3]
Here is what the school says about itself:
Business can be a powerful force for good. But the promise of business hasn’t been extended to enough people. We want to change that. At CU Denver Business School, we make the most of being deeply embedded in the heart of Denver and the nation’s fastest-growing economy to open doors and lower barriers to success. Through our programs and partnerships, we create more inclusive business networks and cultures.

Institutional Profile 
The University of Colorado Denver Business School is accredited by AACSB International.[4] The school is accredited at both the undergraduate and graduate levels and holds a separate accreditation for its accounting program.[5] The school is located in the heart of the Denver Business District and works closely with many of the state’s top businesses including 1st Bank, JP Morgan, TIAA, PwC, Comcast, and Charles Schwab. The Business School's curriculum features input from area businesses which make up the Business School's Board of Advisors and Advisory Councils. Representatives from over 200 business and community organizations contribute to the school's councils with industry expertise and leadership experience.

Business School Centers and Programs
Jake Jabs Center for Entrepreneurship
 J.P. Morgan Center for Commodities
 Center for Information Technology Innovation
 Center for China Financial Research
Institute for International Business
First-Generation and multicultural (FaM) Business Program
Global Energy Management (GEM)
Risk Management and Insurance
Sports and Entertainment
Managing for Sustainability
Health Administration
Daniels Fund Ethics Initiative
Information Technology Innovation
Health Administration Research Consortium (HARC)

Undergraduate Degrees Offered 
The University of Colorado Denver Business School offers one undergraduate degree, a Bachelor of Science in Business Administration. Students can obtain majors in:
 Accounting
 Entrepreneurship
 Finance
 Financial Management
 Human Resources
 Information Systems
 International Business
 Management
 Marketing
 Risk Management and Insurance
 Sports Business

Graduate Degrees Offered

Master of Business Administration Programs 
CU Denver Business School offers the following Master of Business Administration options:
 Professional MBA
 Online Professional MBA
 One Year MBA
 Health Administration MBA
 Executive MBA in Healthcare Administration
 Executive MBA

Master of Science Programs  
CU Denver Business School offers the following Master of Science degrees :
 Accounting
 Business Analytics
 Entrepreneurship
 Finance and Risk Management
 Global Energy Management
 Health Administration
 Information Systems
 International Business
 Management
 Marketing

Specializations for MBA or MS Graduate Degrees 
Accounting
Bioinnovation and Entrepreneurship
Business Analytics
Business Intelligence
Business Strategy
Commodities
Entrepreneurship
Finance
Information Systems
International Business
Management
Managing for Sustainability
Marketing
Risk Management and Insurance
Sports and Entertainment

Dual Degrees 
MBA students can add a Master of Science degree in:
 Accounting
 Business Analytics
 Entrepreneurship
 Finance and Risk Management
 Global Energy Management
Information Systems
 International Business
 Management
 Marketing

In addition, dual degrees can be earned through partners in:

 MD from the University of Colorado School of Medicine
 PharmD from the Skaggs School of Pharmacy and Pharmaceutical Sciences
 MArch from the CU Denver College of Architecture and Planning
 MURP from the CU Denver College of Architecture and Planning
 MLA from the CU Denver College of Architecture and Planning
 MA Political Science from the CU Denver College of Liberal Arts and Sciences
 MS Bioengineering from the CU Denver College of Engineering, Design and Computing 
 Graduate School of Banking at Colorado
 Master of Arts in Economics, CU Denver School of Liberal Arts and Sciences
 MA in Economics from CU Denver can add the MS in Finance

Students from these programs can combine their degrees with an MBA or MS from CU Denver:
 Master of International Management (MIM), Thunderbird School of Global Management, Glendale, Arizona
 Graduate School of Banking, CU Boulder

References

External links 
 

 
Auraria Campus
Education in Aurora, Colorado
Universities and colleges in Denver